VZDOR – strana práce was a far-left political party in Slovakia, formed in 2014. It contested the European Parliament election in 2019 in conjunction with the Communist Party of Slovakia.

References

External links
 

Political parties in Slovakia
2014 establishments in Slovakia
2022 disestablishments in Slovakia
Communist parties in Slovakia
Far-left political parties
International Coordination of Revolutionary Parties and Organizations
Political parties disestablished in 2022
Political parties established in 2014